Itzik Cohen (born January 1, 1990) is an Israeli footballer who currently plays as a striker for Bnei Eilat in the Liga Bet.

References

1990 births
Living people
Israeli Jews
Israeli footballers
Hapoel Jerusalem F.C. players
F.C. Ashdod players
Hakoah Maccabi Amidar Ramat Gan F.C. players
Beitar Jerusalem F.C. players
Maccabi Netanya F.C. players
Hapoel Katamon Jerusalem F.C. players
Liga Leumit players
Israeli Premier League players
Footballers from Jerusalem
Association football forwards